The 2021 Davis Cup World Group I Knock-outs will be held on 26–28 November 2021. The two winners of this round will qualify for the 2022 Davis Cup Qualifying Round while the two losers will qualify for the 2022 Davis Cup World Group I Play-offs.

Teams
Four teams will play for two spots in the Qualifying Round, in series decided on a home and away basis.

These four teams are:
 4 lowest-ranked winning teams from World Group I.

The 2 winning teams from the knock-outs will play at the Qualifying Round and the 2 losing teams will play at the World Group I Play-offs.

''#: Nations Ranking as of 20 September 2021.

Seeded teams
  (#33)
  (#35)

Unseeded teams
  (#40)
  (#43)

The draw was held on 22 September 2021.

Results summary

Knock-outs results

Norway vs. Ukraine

Romania vs. Peru

References

External links

2020–21 Davis Cup